The 1957 World Chess Championship was played between Mikhail Botvinnik and Vasily Smyslov in Moscow from March 5 to April 27, 1957. Botvinnik had been World Champion since 1948, while Smyslov earned the right to challenge by winning the 1956 Candidates tournament. This was the second World Championship match between the pair, after the drawn 1954 match.

Smyslov won the match and became the seventh World Chess Champion. However he lost the title in the 1958 rematch.

1955 Interzonal tournament

An interzonal tournament was held in Göteborg, Sweden, in August and September 1955. The top nine finishers qualified for the Candidates Tournament.

{| class="wikitable"
|+ 1955 Interzonal Tournament
|-
!  !! !! 1 !! 2 !! 3 !! 4 !! 5 !! 6 !! 7 !! 8 !! 9 !! 10 !! 11 !! 12 !! 13 !! 14 !! 15 !! 16 !! 17 !! 18 !! 19 !! 20 !! 21 !! Total !! Tie break
|- style="background:#ccffcc;"
| 1 || align=left| || x || 1 || 1 || ½ || 1 || ½ || ½ || ½ || ½ || ½ || ½ || ½ || ½ || ½ || 1 || 1 || 1 || 1 || 1 || 1 || 1 || 15 ||
|- style="background:#ccffcc;"
| 2 || align=left| || 0 || x || 1 || ½ || ½ || ½ || ½ || ½ || 1 || ½ || 1 || 1 || 1 || ½ || 1 || 1 || 0 || 1 || ½ || ½ || 1 || 13½ ||
|- style="background:#ccffcc;"
| 3 || align=left| || 0 || 0 || x || ½ || 0 || 1 || ½ || ½ || 1 || ½ || 1 || 1 || 1 || ½ || ½ || 1 || ½ || 1 || 1 || 1 || ½ || 13 ||
|- style="background:#ccffcc;"
| 4 || align=left| || ½ || ½ || ½ || x || ½ || ½ || ½ || ½ || ½ || ½ || ½ || ½ || 1 || ½ || ½ || ½ || 1 || ½ || 1 || 1 || 1 || 12½ ||
|- style="background:#ccffcc;"
| 5 || align=left| || 0 || ½ || 1 || ½ || x || ½ || ½ || 1 || ½ || 0 || ½ || ½ || ½ || 0 || 1 || ½ || 1 || 1 || 1 || ½ || 1 || 12 || 111.75
|- style="background:#ccffcc;"
| 6 || align=left| ||½ ||½ ||0 ||½ ||½ ||x ||½ ||½ ||½ ||½ ||½ ||0 ||½ ||½ ||1 ||½ ||1 ||1 ||1 ||1 ||1 || 12 || 108.50
|- style="background:#ccffcc;"
| 7 || align=left| ||½ ||½ ||½ ||½ ||½ ||½ ||x ||½ ||0 ||½ ||½ ||½ ||1 ||½ ||0 ||1 ||½ ||½ ||½ ||1 ||1 ||11 || 104.00
|- style="background:#ccffcc;"
| 8 || align=left| || ½ || ½ || ½ || ½ || 0 || ½ || ½ || x || 0 || ½ || ½ || ½ || ½ || 1 || 1 || ½ || ½ || ½ || ½ || 1 || 1 || 11 || 102.50
|- style="background:#ccffcc;"
| 9 || align=left| ||½ ||0 ||0 ||½ ||½ ||½ ||1 ||1 ||x ||1 ||0 ||0 ||½ ||1 ||½ ||½ ||1 ||0 ||1 ||1 ||½ ||11 || 102.50
|-
| 10 || align=left| ||½ ||½ ||½ ||½ ||1 ||½ ||½ ||½ ||0 ||x ||½ ||0 ||0 ||½ ||½ ||1 ||½ ||½ ||1 ||½ ||1 ||10½ || 100.50
|-
| 11 || align=left| ||½ ||0 ||0 ||½ ||½ ||½ ||½ ||½ ||1 ||½ ||x ||½ ||½ ||½ ||1 ||½ ||½ ||½ ||1 ||½ ||½ ||10½ || 99.25
|-
| 12 || align=left| ||½ ||0 ||0 ||½ ||½ ||1 ||½ ||½ ||1 ||1 ||½ ||x ||0 ||0 ||0 ||½ ||½ ||1 ||½ ||1 ||0 ||9½ ||94.00
|-
| 13 || align=left| ||½ ||0 ||0 ||0 ||½ ||½ ||0 ||½ ||½ ||1 ||½ ||½ ||x ||½ ||1 ||0 ||1 ||½ ||0 ||½ ||1 ||9½ || 89.50
|-
| 14 || align=left| ||½ ||½ ||½ ||½ ||1 ||½ ||½ ||0 ||0 ||½ ||½ ||1 ||½ ||x ||½ ||½ ||½ ||0 ||0 ||1 ||0 ||9 || 93.50
|-
| 15 || align=left| ||0 ||0 ||½ ||½ ||0 ||0 ||1 ||0 ||½ ||½ ||0 ||1 ||0 ||½ ||x ||1 ||1 ||1 ||1 ||0 ||½ ||9 ||81.25
|-
| 16 || align=left| ||0 ||0 ||0 ||½ ||½ ||½ ||0 ||½ ||½ ||0 ||½ ||½ ||1 ||½ ||0 ||x ||½ ||½ ||½ ||1 ||1 ||8½ ||
|-
| 17 || align=left| ||0 ||1 ||½ ||0 ||0 ||0 ||½ ||½ ||0 ||½ ||½ ||½ ||0 ||½ ||0 ||½ ||x ||1 ||½ ||½ ||1 ||8 || 74.00
|-
| 18 || align=left| ||0 ||0 ||0 ||½ ||0 ||0 ||½ ||½ ||1 ||½ ||½ ||0 ||½ ||1 ||0 ||½ ||0 ||x ||½ ||1 ||1 ||8 || 70.50
|-
| 19 || align=left| ||0 ||½ ||0 ||0 ||0 ||0 ||½ ||½ ||0 ||0 ||0 ||½ ||1 ||1 ||0 ||½ ||½ ||½ ||x ||0 ||0 || 5½ || 53.25
|-
| 20 || align=left| ||0 ||½ ||0 ||0 ||½ ||0 ||0 ||0 ||0 ||½ ||½ ||0 ||½ ||0 ||1 ||0 ||½ ||0 ||1 ||x ||½ ||5½ || 49.25
|-
| 21 || align=left| ||0 ||0 ||½ ||0 ||0 ||0 ||0 ||0 ||½ ||0 ||½ ||1 ||0 ||1 ||½ ||0 ||0 ||0 ||1 ||½ ||x ||5½ || 48.50
|}

Ilivitsky won a 6-game match against Pachman (1-0 with 5 draws) to qualify as first reserve for the Candidates.

1956 Candidates tournament

The 1956 Candidates tournament was held in Amsterdam in the Netherlands in April and May. As the loser of the last championship match, Smyslov was seeded directly into the tournament and joined by the top nine from the Interzonal. Smyslov won, once again becoming the challenger in the 1957 championship match.

With two rounds remaining, the leaders were Smyslov 10, Keres 9½, Geller 9. In the penultimate round, Keres lost in a winning position against Filip, while Smyslov and Geller drew their games, giving Smyslov a full point lead. Smyslov also won his final game, against Pilnik, to ensure victory.

{| class="wikitable" style="text-align: center;"
|+ 1956 Candidates Tournament
|-
! !! !! 1 !! 2 !! 3 !! 4 !! 5 !! 6 !! 7 !! 8 !! 9 !! 10 !! Score 
|- style="background:#ccffcc;"
| 1  || align=left|                      || xx || = = || = = || 0 = || = = || = 1 || 1 1 || = 1 || 1 = || = 1 || 11½
|-
| 2  || align=left|                          || = = || xx || = = || = = || = = || = 1 || = = || = 0 || 1 = || 1 = || 10 
|-
| 3-7 || align=left| || = = || = = || xx || 1 = || = = || = = || = 1 || 0 = || = = || 0 1 || 9½ 
|-
| 3-7 || align=left|                       || 1 = || = = || 0 = || xx || = = || = 1 || 0 = || = = || = = || = 1 || 9½
|-
| 3-7 || align=left|                    || = = || = = || = = || = = || xx || 0 = || 0 1 || 1 = || = = || 1 = || 9½ 
|-
| 3-7 || align=left|                     || = 0 || = 0 || = = || = 0 || 1 = || xx || = 1 || 1 = || = = || = 1 || 9½ 
|-
| 3-7 || align=left|                         || 0 0 || = = || = 0 || 1 = || 1 0 || = 0 || xx || 1 1 || = 1 || 1 = || 9½ 
|-
| 8-9 || align=left|                    || = 0 || = 1 || 1 = || = = || 0 = || 0 = || 0 0 || xx || 1 0 || = 1 || 8 
|-
| 8-9 || align=left|                            || 0 = || 0 = || = = || = = || = = || = = || = 0 || 0 1 || xx || 1 = || 8 
|-
| 10 || align=left|                          || = 0 || 0 = || 1 0 || = 0 || 0 = || = 0 || 0 = || = 0 || 0 = || xx || 5 
|}

1957 Championship match

The match was played as best of 24 games. If it ended 12-12, Botvinnik, the holder, would retain the Championship. Smyslov won.

References

External links

1957 World Chess Championship at the Internet Archive record of Graeme Cree's Chess Pages

1957
1957 in chess
1957 in Soviet sport
1957 in Moscow